(Main list of acronyms)



Q0–9 
 Q1 – (p) First Quarter
 Q2 – (p) Second Quarter
 Q3 – (p) Third Quarter
 Q4 – (p) Fourth Quarter

QA 
 QA – (s) Qatar (FIPS 10-4 country code; ISO 3166 digram)
 Qantas – (a) Queensland And Northern Territory Aerial Services
 QAP – (a) Quadripartite Advisory Publication ("kwapp")
 QAR – (s) Qatari rial (ISO 4217 currency code)
 QAT – (s) Qatar (ISO 3166 trigram)

QB 
 QB – (p) Quarterback (football)

QC 
 QC – (i) Quality Control – (s) Québec (postal symbol) – (i) Queen's Counsel
 QCA – (i) Qualifications and Curriculum Authority – Quality Council of Alberta
 QCD – (i) Qualified Charitable Distribution - (p) Quantum ChromoDynamics

QD 
 QD – (i) quaque die (Latin, "daily")
 QDOS – (p) Quick and Dirty Operating System ("cue-doss")
 QDR – (i) Quadrennial Defense Review
 QDRO – (a) Qualified domestic relations order ("quad-ro")

QE 
 QED – (p) quantum electrodynamics – (i) quid es demonstrata or quod erat demonstrandum (Latin, "that proves it" or "which was to be demonstrated")
 QEH – (i) Queen Elizabeth's Hospital

QF 
 QFE – (i) Quoted For Emphasis – (s) Local ground level atmospheric pressure (aeronautical Q code)

QI 
 QID – (i)  (Latin, "four times daily")
 QIP – (a) Quadrilateral Interoperability Programme (ancestor of MIP; "quip")

QK 
 QK – (s) Air Canada Jazz (IATA airline designator)

QL 
 QLD – (p) Queensland, (Australia) (postal symbol)

QM 
 QM – (i) Quality Management – Quantum Mechanics – Queen Mother

QN 
 QNH – (s) Regional mean sea level atmospheric pressure (aeronautical Q code)

QP 
 QPR – (i) Queens Park Rangers F.C. (English football team) – (i) Quality-Price Ratio (wine evaluation term)
 QPS – (i) Quark Publishing System

QR 
 QR – (i) Quake Rally – Qualitative Reasoning – Queensland Rail –  Queen's Rangers – Quick Release – Quiet Riot – (s) Qatar Airways (IATA airline designator)

QS 
 QS – (i) quantum sufficit (Latin, "as much as suffices")
 QSCAT – (p) Quick Scatterometer satellite
 QSL – (i) Québec Sign Language
 QSO – (i) Quasi-Stellar Object
 QSTAG – (p) Quadripartite Standardization Agreement ("cue-stag")

QT 
 QT –  (i) Quentin Tarantino – QuickTime – QuikTrip – QT (cute) Software
QTE - Quick Time Event
 QTT - (i) Qualified Treatment Trainee - in Wisconsin, a designation for a mental health provider in training as defined in DHS 35.03(17m)

QU 
 qu – (s) Quechua language (ISO 639-1 code)
 Quango – (p) (British Commonwealth) QUasi Autonomous Non-Governmental Organisation
 Quasar – (p) Quasi-stellar radio source
 QUB - Queen's University Belfast
 que – (s) Quechua language (ISO 639-2 code)
 QUIET – (p) Q and U Imaging ExperimenT (Q and U are the Stokes parameters of the CMBR polarization)

QV 
 qv – (i) quod vide (Latin "which see")
 QVC – (i) "Quality, Value, Convenience" (home shopping channel)

QW 
 QWG – (i) Quadripartite Working Group ("qwig")
 QWGAOR – (i) Quadripartite Working Group on Army Operational Research ("qwig-a-o-r")

QX 
 QX - (i) Quality of Experience

QZ 
 QZ – (s) Awair (IATA airline designator)

Acronyms Q